Bouton may refer to:

Biology
 Axon terminal, also called synaptic bouton or terminal bouton

Places
 Bouton, Iowa, a town in the United States
 Bouton, an older English spelling, no longer in use, for Buton, an island in Indonesia

People
 Alphonse Bouton (1908-?), French rower
 Anaïs Bouton (1970-), French television presenter
 Arthur F. Bouton (1872–1952), New York state senator
 Betty Bouton (1891-?) American actress
 Bruce Bouton (born 1954), American musician
 Charles L. Bouton (1869–1922), American mathematician
 Charles Marie Bouton (1781-1853), French painter
 Christopher Bouton, American businessman
 Claude Bouton, Lord of Corbaron, courtier, poet, and diplomat
 Emily St. John Bouton (1837–1927), American educator, journalist, author, editor
 Georges Bouton (1847-1938), French toymaker and engineer
 Jim Bouton (1939–2019), American MLB player, author of Ball Four
 John Bouton (1636–1707), founding settler of Norwalk, Connecticut
 Nathaniel Bouton (1799–1878), American minister and historian
 Raphaël Bouton (born 1969), French politician
 Rosa Bouton (1860–1951), American chemist and professor

Other
 De Dion-Bouton, a French automobile manufacturer
 Synaptic bouton, part of a chemical synapse
 Canine assistant of Mother Hildegarde de Gascogne in the Outlander series

See also
 Boughton (disambiguation)